This article lists the winners and nominees for the Black Reel Award for Outstanding Actor in a Television Movie or Limited Series. The category was retired during the 2008 ceremony, but later returned in 2012. In May 2017 the category was moved from the film awards as part of the Black Reel Awards for Television honors thus resulting in two separate winners in 2017.

Winners and nominees
Winners are listed first and highlighted in bold.

2000s

2010s

2020s

Superlatives

Programs with multiple awards

Performers with multiple awards

Programs with multiple nominations

3 nominations
 The New Edition Story

2 nominations
 American Crime Story
 The Corner
 Love Songs
 Luther

Performers with multiple nominations

4 nominations
 Andre Braugher
 Ving Rhames

3 nominations
 Idris Elba

2 nominations
 Laurence Fishburne
 Danny Glover
 Cuba Gooding Jr.
 Dulé Hill
 Roger Guenveur Smith
 Delroy Lindo
 Woody McClain

Total awards by network
 HBO - 4
 FX - 3
 BET - 2
 Netflix - 2
 Showtime - 2
 Starz - 2
 ABC - 1 
 BBC America - 1
 Disney+ - 1
 Lifetime - 1

References

Black Reel Awards